Jamie Gosling (born 21 March 1982) is an English former professional football midfielder. He previously played professionally in the Football League for Yeovil Town and Torquay United. He currently lives in Australia after setting up the Jamie Gosling Football Academy in Cairns, the largest junior football coaching academy in Far North Queensland.

Club career
Gosling was on schoolboy terms with Bristol Rovers before joining Team Bath. He left in September 2000 to join local rivals Bath City. In April 2003 he had a trial with Cheltenham Town and in July 2003 joined Yeovil Town. He made his league debut on 9 August 2003 as Yeovil won 3–1 away to Rochdale, Yeovil's first ever game in the Football League. On 4 January 2004, while at Yeovil Town, Gosling came on as a 77th minute substitute in the televised FA Cup third round 2–0 home defeat against Liverpool at Huish Park.

Gosling joined Conference National side Aldershot Town on loan in March 2004, appearing in the 2004 Football Conference Play-off Final against Shrewsbury Town in front of a crowd of 19,216 at the Britannia Stadium in Stoke. Gosling had trials with Chester City, Boston United and Hereford United during the 2004 close-season, before returning to Team Bath on a short-term contract in August 2004.

He joined Weymouth that November, but played just once, in the FA Trophy, before joining Torquay United on a free transfer.

Gosling made his Torquay debut as a half-time substitute for Martin Phillips as Torquay lost 1–0 at home to Barnsley and started, and scored in, the 1–1 draw away to Chesterfield the following week. He lost his place after Torquay's 1–1 draw away to Huddersfield Town on 8 January 2005, a game in which Gosling was replaced early in the second half by Matthew Hockley, and was released in February 2005.

He joined Woking later that month and was a regular until the end of the season.

In August 2005 Gosling joined Forest Green Rovers, but was released in November 2005.

Gosling joined Hungerford Town in the 2006 close season, and he suffered a collapsed lung in March 2007 in a game against Shortwood United. In May 2007, his initial one-year contract with Hungerford was extended by a further year. At Hungerford, Gosling played with future England striker Charlie Austin.

He rejoined Bath City in June 2008 but left again in November 2008 rejoining former club Hungerford Town.
In 2009, Gosling moved to Belgium for a short period, playing at RRFC Montegnée.

Move to Australia
In 2010, Gosling moved to Australia, and after spells at clubs in both Sydney and Melbourne, joined Douglas United in Far North Queensland in 2013, playing in the FNQ Premier League before signing with Far North Queensland FC in Cairns in 2014, where he played in the National Premier Leagues Queensland until 2017.

Coaching career
In July 2015, Gosling announced the launch of the Jamie Gosling Football Academy, the largest football coaching academy in Cairns for boys and girls aged 2–16.

References

External links

Living people
1982 births
Sportspeople from Bath, Somerset
English footballers
Association football midfielders
Team Bath F.C. players
Bath City F.C. players
Yeovil Town F.C. players
Aldershot Town F.C. players
Weymouth F.C. players
Torquay United F.C. players
Woking F.C. players
Forest Green Rovers F.C. players
Hungerford Town F.C. players
R.R.F.C. Montegnée players
Cairns FC players
English Football League players
National League (English football) players
National Premier Leagues players